Social thinking or thinking socially refers to a methodology created by Michelle Garcia Winner; it is described as a piece we all go through in our minds as we try to make sense of our others’ thoughts, feelings, and intentions in context, whether we are existing, actively interacting, or figuring out what is happening from a distance (e.g., media, literature, etc.). Our ability to think socially is part of social learning that begins at birth and evolves across our lifetime. Social thinking in this context, is also referred to as social cognition.

The social thinking is a developmental, language-based and thinking-based (metacognitive) methodology that gives visual frameworks, unique vocabulary, strategies, and activities by foster social competence. The methodology has assessment and treatment components for both interventionists and social.  The methodology includes components of other well-known and evidence based interventions such as Social Stories, Hidden Curriculum, 5-point scale, and others, etc. Social Thinking shares ideals with self-regulation, executive functioning, central coherence issues, and perspective-taking.

History 
The social thinking methodology was originally developed by Michelle Garcia Winner as an intervention and assessment framework dedicated to tackling the complex social emotional learning needs of individuals with social learning challenges. At its inception 20+ years ago, there were relatively few treatment-based research studies available to guide" interventionists in how to teach individuals about their own social learning process. This relative lack of treatment research, while not as stark today, continues to be limited. The underlying motivation for the creation of the Social Thinking Methodology was, and is, that of, for to, individuals with social learning issues should have access to interventions and strategies based on both individual learning abilities and the demands of the community within which they participate.  While the tools and strategies within the methodology were developed while working with mainstream students in a high school district, Michelle Garcia Winner‘s practical approach to teaching social competencies was quickly adopted by parents and teachers working with those in the ADHD community and autism spectrum community.

The social thinking methodology teaches social learners to consider the points of view, emotions, and intentions of others. In this methodology, social thinking and social skills are dynamic and situational. So, the decision to use discrete social skills (e.g. smiling versus “looking cool”, standing casually versus formally, swearing/speaking informally versus speaking politely) are not based on memorizing specific social rules (as often taught in our social skills groups), but on a social decision-making mental process.

Social thinking and evidence base 
The social thinking methodology embraces what literature says about working directly with individuals who have social learning challenges (e.g., ASD, social communication disorder, ADHD, learning disabilities, twice exceptional, etc.) and promotes the use of visual supports, modeling, naturalistic teaching, and self-management. Also, the methodology anchors to the research in fields that study how social learners evolve and develop to function in society: anthropology, cultural linguistics, social psychology, child development, and others. Many of the components of Social Thinking fit well into the multi-tiered research-based implementation framework of Positive Behavioral Intervention and Supports (PBIS). And while PBIS is not an approach, it is a framework that encourages schools to consider the uptake of a variety of practices where the "mutually beneficial relationship between academic and social behavior student success is highlighted (Chard, Harn, Sugai, & Horner, 2008; Sugai, Horner, & Gresham, 2002). In the same vein, CASEL's five Social and Emotional Learning (SEL) Core Competencies (http://www.casel.org/social-­‐and-­‐emotional-­‐learning/core-­‐competencies) are reflected within and throughout the social thinking methodology.

Social thinking theorizes that successful social thinkers are able to consider the points of view, emotions, thoughts, beliefs, prior knowledge and intentions of others (this is often called perspective-taking). Social Thinking™ also demonstrates the link between one’s social learning abilities and his or her related ability (or disability) when processing and responding to school curriculum based in the use of the social mind (e.g., reading comprehension of literature, some aspects of written expression, etc.). Winner and colleagues argue that individuals who share a diagnostic label (e.g., autism spectrum disorder) nonetheless exhibit extremely different social learning traits, or social mind profiles, and should have unique treatment trajectories, such as those based in cognitive-behavioral therapy (CBT).

Teaching social competencies: more than social skills
The social thinking methodology is not a single entity. It is not a set of behaviors that one can teach. It is not a step-by-step “cookbook”, nor is it one single program or approach. Social thinking is a language and cognitive-based methodology that focuses on the dynamic and synergistic nature of social interpretation and social communication skills, both of which require social problem solving. The methodology is developmental, utilizing aspects of behavioral and cognitive behavioral principles, as well as stakeholder input as a way to translate evidence-based concepts into conceptual frameworks, strategy-based frameworks, curricula, activities, and motivational tools.

The methodology addresses the fact that first interventionists (both professionals and parents) need to build knowledge about the social learning process and what it means to engage “socially” before teaching individuals with social challenges. Understanding how people share space together and engage across context, culture and varying ideas and opinions, motives and intentions is absent from most social "skills‐based” approaches. The methodology ascribes to the notion that the key to understanding individual social learning needs requires that interventionists gain insight into the variables that contribute to their own “social self” as well as the related expectations of others. This unique view toward social treatment, combined with the many layers of the methodology, means that the components of social thinking do not fit neatly into any single traditionally defined social skill intervention. Nor is social thinking linked to a specific diagnosis (e.g., ASD), but rather addresses specific needs in those with social learning challenges (ADHD, mental health challenges, twice exceptional, gifted, no diagnosis, etc.), regardless of the diagnosis.

Notes

References 
 Tarshis, N., Winner, M. G., & Crooke, P. (2020). What Does It Mean to Be Social? Defining the Social Landscape for Children With Childhood Apraxia of Speech. "Perspectives of the ASHA Special Interest Groups", 1-10. .
 Baker-Ericzén, M.J., Fitch, M.A., Kinnear, M., Jenkins, M.M., Twamley, E.W., Smith, L., Montano, G., Feder, J., Crooke, P.J., Winner, M.G. and Leon, J. (2018). Development of the Supported Employment, Comprehensive Cognitive Enhancement, and Social Skills program for adults on the autism spectrum: Results of initial study. Autism, 22(1), pp. 6–19 .
Crooke, P. J., Winner, M. G., & Olswang, L. B. (2016). Thinking socially: teaching social knowledge to foster social behavioral change. Topics in Language Disorders, 36(3), 284-298 .
Crooke, P.J., Winner, M.G. (2016), Social Thinking Methodology: Evidence-Based or Empirically Supported? A Response to Leaf et al. (2016), Behavior Analysis in Practice, 9(4), 403-408 .
Crooke, P. J., & Olswang, L. (2015). Practice-based Research: Another Pathway for Closing the Research-Practice Gap. Journal of Speech, Language, and Hearing Research .
Lee, K. Y. S., Crooke, P. J., Lui, A.L.Y, Kan, P.P.K, Luke, K.L, Mak, Y.M, Cheung, P.M.P, Cheng, L., & Wong, I. (2015). The outcome of a social cognitive training for mainstream adolescents with social communication deficits in a Chinese community, International Journal of Disability, Development and Education, doi:10.1080/1034912X.2015.106596 0
Winner, M.G. & Crooke, P. J. (2014). Executive functioning and social pragmatic communication skills: Exploring the threads in our social fabric. Perspectives on Language Learning and Education, Vol. 21 (2), pp. 42–50 .
Winner, M. G. & Crooke P.J. (2013). Social Learning and Social Functioning: Social Thinking's  Cascade of Social Functioning. Attention Magazine .

 Lee, K.Y.S., Lui, A.L.Y., Kan, P.P.K., Luke, K.M., Mak, Y.M., Cheung, P.M.P., Cheng, L. & Wong, I. (2009). A case series on the social thinking training of mainstreamed secondary school students with high-functioning autism. Hong Kong Journal of Mental Health, 35(1), 10–17.
 Winner, M.  & Crooke, P. (2011) Thinking about Thinking: Social Communication for adolescents with Autism. ASHA Leader Magazine, MD.
 Winner, M., Crooke, P, & Madrigal (2010) It’s a Girl Thing or Is it?:  Social Thinking and Social Skills in Girls, Teens, and Women with Social Learning Issues, Autism Asperger Digest
 Winner, M.  & Crooke, P. (2009) Social Thinking: A Training Paradigm for Professionals and Treatment Approach for Individuals with Social Learning/Social Pragmatic Challenges. Perspectives on Language Learning and Education, 16 62–69. 

Cognition
Cognitive psychology
Developmental psychology
Emotional intelligence
Human development
Learning
Life skills
Mental processes
Perception
Social psychology